List of books on the European Union:
 Brussels Laid Bare by Marta Andreasen (2009) St Edwards Press, 
 Blowing the Whistle: Fraud in the European Commission by Paul van Buitenen (2000) Politicos Publishing, 
 The European Dream by Jeremy Rifkin (2009) 
 In de loopgraven van Brussel: de slag om een transparant Europa by Paul van Buitenen  (2004) Ten Have, 
 The Imminent Crisis: Greek Debt and the Collapse of the European Monetary Union by Grant Wonders (2010) Cambridge: GW Publishing; CreateSpace. .
 Raumschiff Brüssel. Wie die Demokratie in Europa scheitert (Spaceship Brussels. How democracy in Europe fails) by Andreas Oldag and Hans-Martin Tillack (German, 2003) S. Fischer Verlag, 
 The United States of Europe, A Eurotopia? by Freddy Heineken (1992) Amsterdam, De Amsterdamse Stichting voor de Historische Wetenschap,

References

European Union
Works about the European Union
European Union-related lists
European Union